Shafiq Syed (born 1976) is an Indian auto rickshaw driver and former child actor. At the age of twelve, he played the lead role in Mira Nair's Academy Award-nominated film Salaam Bombay! (1988), for which he also received the 1989 National Film Award for Best Child Artist at the 36th National Film Awards. As an adult, he drives an auto rickshaw in Bangalore and also works as an assistant in television production units.
 
Syed grew up in Bangalore slums, before running away to Bombay (now Mumbai) with some friends, "just to see if what we saw in Hindi movies (Bollywood) were right". In the following years, he lived as one of the street children living on the pavements near Churchgate railway station.

After doing one more film, Patang (1994) directed by Goutam Ghose, he returned to Bangalore in 1993. In 2009, after the success of Slumdog Millionaire, also known for its child actors, he was spotted as an autorickshaw driver in Bangalore and interviewed by The Times of India.  
Thereafter, in May 2012, he was working as an assistant in production companies making Kannada television soaps. It was reported that Syed had written his life's story, running into 180 pages. "I have...titled it After Salaam Bombay" he said. "Hope someone will take it up for production".

He is married and lives in a Bangalore suburb, 30 km  from the main city, with his  wife, mother and three sons and a daughter.

Filmography

References

External links
 

1976 births
Living people
Indian male child actors
Male actors in Hindi cinema
20th-century Indian male actors
Male actors from Mumbai
Male actors from Bangalore
Indian male film actors
Best Child Artist National Film Award winners